Alick Kalwihzi (born 6 May 1960) is a former Zambian male judoka. He represented Zambia at the 1984 Summer Olympics and competed in the men's lightweight event.

References 

1960 births
Living people
Zambian male judoka
Judoka at the 1984 Summer Olympics
Olympic judoka of Zambia